Neocities is a commercial web hosting service for static pages. It offers 1 GB of storage space for free sites and no server-side scripting for both paid and free subscriptions. The service's expressed goal is to revive the support of free web hosting of the now-defunct GeoCities. Neocities started in 2013. As of 2022, it hosted more than 460,000 sites.

History 
Neocities was created by Kyle Drake on May 23, 2013, and launched on June 28, 2013, offering 10 megabytes of file storage for every user. It initially served as an archive for sites previously hosted on GeoCities before the latter's shutdown.

On May 8, 2014, Neocities announced that it would limit the bandwidth speed of the FCC headquarters to early dial-up modem speeds as a protest against FCC's stance on net neutrality. This protest received wide attention and lasted until February 2, 2015.

The service hosted about 55,000 to 57,000 sites in 2015, which had risen to over 460,000 by 2022.

As of currently, Neocities allows 1 GB of storage to free users, and 50 GB of storage to "supporters".

Usage 
Neocities allows users to create their own websites using programming languages such as HTML, CSS, and JavaScript. The tool comes with a built-in debugger for the languages listed previously. It also allows users to use other languages as well, but it will not check their errors.

Neocities has 2 options for users to store their data. A free plan, which has 1 gigabyte of data storage and slower transfer speeds, and a paid plan, which allows 50 gigabytes of storage and faster transfer speeds. The paid plan costs $5.00 per month, and funds go to server expenses.

Neocities allows users to host HTML files, CSS files, Javascript files, Markdown files, XML files, text files, fonts and images. By upgrading to their paid plan, this restriction is removed. This restriction is in place to prevent it from becoming a "file dump".

References

External links 
 

Free web hosting services
Internet properties established in 2013